Yujiulü Anagui (Rouran: Anakay;(?–552) was ruler of the Rouran (520–552) with the title of Chiliantoubingdoufa Khagan.

First reign 
His reign started with troubles. First rebellion started after 10 days of his coronation when his brother-in-law Qilifa Shifa (俟力發示發) rose against him, killing Anagui's younger brother Yujiulü Yijufa (郁久閭乙居伐) and his mother Hou Luling (侯呂陵) on his attack, paving way for Anagui's cousin Yujiulü Poluomen. Having lost the fight, Anagui fled to Northern Wei. Emperor Xiaoming sheltered him and ordered his advisors to bring him to palace. As Khagan asked for troops to regain his throne, emperor recognized him but postponed any idea of going to war. Restless Anagui bribed Yuan Cha to leave capital. Emperor suddenly changed his idea when Anagui was about to leave in 521, helped him from martial and economic perspective.

Second reign 
Back in Rouran, Qilifa Shifa this time opposed Yujiulü Poluomen, invading his domains. Poluomen's further defeat by Gaoche forced Northern Wei to divide Rouran between Anagui and Poluomen in order to establish stability. Anagui resided in Huaishuo (modern Guyang, Inner Mongolia), while Poluomen ruled from Xihai (modern Ejin, Inner Mongolia). Poluomen later fled to Hephtalites in 524, but was arrested and brought to Northern Wei court, who executed him and made Anagui ruler of both parts of the khaganate. Swaying unto Chinese influence, Anagui reformed Rouran after Chinese bureaucracy, made a Han Chinese his chancellor. In 522, he asked for millet for sowing and received 10000 bags from China. However his agricultural project didn't work out, therefore he started to raid Wei frontier towns due to hunger in 523.

Later in 525, he answered Wei call for suppressing revolt in Six Frontier Towns with 100.000 strong Rouran army, plundering rebellious people. He tried to maintain balance between Wei and Liang following years, sending gifts to both parties. He asked for a princess in marriage in 533, a request that was accepted. Emperor Xiaowu sent a cousin of his, Princess Lanling (蘭陵公主) as his bride. In 535, he managed to get another princess for his family, this time to his brother Yujiulü Tahan (郁久閭塔寒), who was married to Princess Huazheng (化政公主), daughter of a Northern Wei official Yuan Yi (元翌). He also forced Emperor Wen to divorce Empress Yifu and marry Yujiulü Anagui's daughter.  Emperor Wen agreed, and divorced Empress Yifu, making her a Buddhist nun. He then married Yujiulü Anagui's daughter and created her empress. For a while, this brought peace with Rouran. In 540, she was pregnant when Rouran launched a major attack on Western Wei — causing the Western Wei officials to believe that the attack was launched because she was jealous of the former Empress Yifu, who was by then a Buddhist nun. Emperor Wen, under pressure, ordered Empress Yifu to commit suicide. Later in the year, when Empress Yujiulü herself was about to give birth, she heard unusual barking noises in the palace, and she suspected them as from the spirit of Empress Yifu. She therefore grew depressed, and she died either during or shortly after childbirth in 540.

Eastern Wei regent Gao Huan skillfully used this opportunity, sent Zhang Weiquan, who transmitted a letter to the Khagan. The letter said that Yuwen Tai killed Emperor Wen, poisoned the empress and wants to destroy the Rouran. At the military council, the nobles of Rouran spoke in favor of recognizing Eastern Wei. Anagui paid a small tribute in recognition of Eastern Wei. After lengthy negotiations, Gao Huan decided to send Princess Le'an (樂安公主) for Yujiulü Anluochen. In 541, the khagan sent 1,000 horses and asked to bring the princess, who was now renamed Princess Lanling (蘭陵公主). In view of the importance of an alliance with the Rouran, Gao Huan personally presided the collection of the dowry and led the princess and her retinue to Rouran. Anagui was very pleased with the marriage. This year he also ended the Gaoche threat for once and all.

The alliance with Eastern Wei turned out to be quite bountiful. Now northern China was weakened by the civil war between Western and Eastern Wei (between the Yuwen Tai and Gao Huan, the actual rulers) and the Rouran didn't fear devastating invasions of their lands. Population increased and Anaguy became one of the strongest rulers in the region. His Han Chinese secretary of the khagan, persuaded him not to sign the messages as a vassal - but as an equal sovereign. Anagui often switched between sides.

In fall 545, due to an alliance between Western Wei and Rouran to attack Eastern Wei, Gao Huan sued for peace with Rouran by requesting a marriage between a daughter of Anagui and Gao Cheng. Yujiulü Anagui refused, stating that it would only be sufficient if Gao Huan himself married her. Gao Huan himself initially refused, but Princess Lou, Gao Cheng and Wei Jing all persuaded him otherwise, and he married Yujiulü Anagui's daughter, referring to her as the Princess Ruru (蠕蠕公主). To facilitate this marriage, Princess Lou moved out of the mansion, but Gao Huan and Princess Lou were not formally divorced.

Next year, in 546, his bannerman Ashina Tumen suppressed a Tiele revolt against Rouran. Following this, Tumen felt entitled to request of the Rouran a princess as his wife. Anagui sent an emissary to Bumin to rebuke him, saying, "You are my blacksmith slave. How dare you utter these words?". Tumen got angry, killed Anagui's emissary, and severed relations with the Rouran Khaganate, started an open revolt with help of Yuwen Tai.

Death and succession 
Some time between February 11 - March 10, 552, Anagui was defeated by Tumen (Bumin) in the north of Huaihuang (in present-day Zhangjiakou, Hebei) and committed suicide. Following the defeat, Anagui's son Anluochen fled to Northern Qi, while his uncle Yujiulü Dengshuzi succeeded him under protection of Western Wei. Another relative, Yujiulü Tiefa declared himself khagan in east of Gobi.

Family 
He was married to Princess Lanling (蘭陵公主), daughter of Yuan Yi, Prince Qinghe Wenxian (清河文獻王 元懌; 488–520) and granddaughter of Emperor Xiaowen of Northern Wei. He had following children:

 Yujiulü Anluochen
 Empress Yujiulü (525-540) - Empress of Western Wei
 Princess Ruru (530 - 6 May 548) - Consort of Gao Huan.

Sources 

Khagans of the Rouran
472 births
552 deaths
Suicides in China
Ancient people who committed suicide